The siege of Diriyah took place in late 1818 at the end of the Wahhabi War of 1811–18 during the Nejd Expedition. 

Ibrahim Pasha arrived at the gates of Diriyah with 2,000 cavalrymen, 4,300 Turkish and Albanian soldiers, 1,300 Maghrebi cavalrymen, 150 gunners with around 15 guns, 20 weapons technicians and 11 sappers’. After the total destruction of his capital and its fortifications Abdullah surrendered to the Ottomans on September 11. Ibrahim Pasha’s troops plundered Diriyah and massacred several Wahhabi ulama.

Ibrahim pasha showed a harsh attitude towards the conquered Arabians. He ordered Abdullah to prepare for the journey to Istanbul, 400 men escorted him to Cairo where Muhammad Ali kindly received him, two days later he was hurried off to Istanbul guarded by a detachment of Tartars. When he reached Istanbul he was paraded in the streets for three days amid celebrations. Several Turkish ulama tried to convince him of the errors of his faith during his brief imprisonment. When the spectacle was over Abdullah was beheaded, after the execution his head was crushed with a mortar and his body was suspended on a post with a dagger plunged into it for all to see.

More brutal punishments of the Wahhabis followed, notably against two sheikhs who had personally offended Ibrahim Pasha two years earlier. The first who was the former governor of Diriyah had all of his teeth pulled out while the second was beaten and tied to the mouth of cannon which was then fired.

References 

 The title of glory in the history of Najd, Ibn Bishr

Diriyah
Diriyah
Diriyah
Battles involving Saudi Arabia
Diriyah
April 1818 events
Diriyah